Horacio Marcelo Arce (born October 20, 1970) is an Argentine former footballer who played for clubs from Argentina, Chile, Mexico, Colombia and Austria. He played as a striker.

References
 
 

1970 births
Living people
Footballers from Buenos Aires
Argentine expatriate footballers
Argentine footballers
San Martín de San Juan footballers
Argentinos Juniors footballers
Godoy Cruz Antonio Tomba footballers
Olimpo footballers
Querétaro F.C. footballers
Atlético Bucaramanga footballers
C.D. Antofagasta footballers
Chilean Primera División players
Argentine Primera División players
Categoría Primera A players
Expatriate footballers in Chile
Expatriate footballers in Mexico
Expatriate footballers in Austria
Expatriate footballers in Colombia
Association football forwards